The American School of Dubai (ASD) is an independent, not-for-profit, U.S. curriculum, Early Learning through Grade 12 international school offering an American education. The school was founded in 1966 and was previously known as the Jumeirah American School (JAS), is now located in the Al-Barsha community of Dubai, United Arab Emirates.

In 2018-2019 ASD won awards for sustainability efforts. Most notably the Zayed Sustainability Prize (ZPS), Global High School Category (MENA Region) Award 2019 and 2020 Expo, 2018 Sustainability Champions Competition. Additional awards include Knowledge Review Magazine's, 10 Best International Schools in Dubai 2019; Winner of the SchoolsCompared.com, Best American Curriculum School of the Year 2019.

Around 2008, the school was reviewed by the Good Schools Guide International as "One of the best thought-of and long established schools in Dubai". It was also rated by UAE based schools review web site, WhichSchoolAdvisor.com as one of the best schools in Dubai in 2012.

The Knowledge and Human Development Authority (KHDA) rated the school as "Good" for the academic years 2008 through to the 2019 report.

Academics 
ASD offers a variety of courses, including Advanced Placement classes, offering the most AP classes in the Emirate of Dubai. It currently offers:

 AP 2-D Art and Design
 AP 3-D Art and Design
 AP Biology
 AP Calculus AB
 AP Calculus BC
 AP Chemistry
 AP Computer Science A
 AP Computer Science Principles
 AP Drawing
 AP English Language
 AP English Literature
 AP European History
 AP Human Geography
 AP Macroeconomics
 AP Microeconomics
 AP Physics 2
 AP Physics C: Electricity and Magnetism
 AP Physics C: Mechanics
 AP Psychology
 AP Research
 AP Seminar
 AP Spanish Language and Culture 
 AP Spanish Literature and Culture
 AP Statistics
 AP United States History
 AP World History

Demographics
, there are about 2,010 students. Suburbs housing ASD students include: Al Barsha, Arabian Ranches, Dubai Marina, Jebel Ali, Jumeirah, Meadows, Motor City, Palm Jumeirah, and Umm Suqeim. In addition some ASD students live in Sharjah. 82 countries were represented in the student body.

References

External links
American School of Dubai
Information on dubaifaqs.com

Buildings and structures in Dubai
American international schools in the United Arab Emirates
Educational institutions established in 1966
International schools in Dubai
Private schools in the United Arab Emirates
International schools in the United Arab Emirates
1966 establishments in the Trucial States